Duncan David Elias (born 14 July 1985) is a Singaporean footballer who used to play in the S.League for Geylang International as a defender.

Club career
Duncan is known for being a set-piece specialist  and he is a regular corner taker for corners on the right side of the pitch due to his ability to provide in-swinging crosses with his left foot.

On 23 November 2012, it was announced by Woodlands Wellington that he would not be retained for the 2013 season.

On 4 January 2013, it was confirmed that Duncan would be moving to Geylang International during a press conference by the Eagles.

He was unable to secure a long-term contract with any football team in 2014.

Club career statistics

All numbers encased in brackets signify substitute appearances.

References

1985 births
Living people
Singaporean footballers
Singaporean people of European descent
Singaporean sportspeople of Chinese descent
Hougang United FC players
Woodlands Wellington FC players
Geylang International FC players
Singapore Premier League players
Association football defenders